"Chiquitas" is a song by French singer Ilona Mitrecey from her second album Laissez-nous respirer. It was the album's second track and it was released as its second single. The single came out around four months after the album, in April 2007, and debuted at number 15 in France, peaking at number 13 the next week.

Charts

References 

2006 songs
2007 singles
Ilona Mitrecey songs
Universal Music Group singles